was an Academy Award-winning theatrical, movie and ballet costume designer from Japan.

Life and career
Wada was born in Kyoto Prefecture. At 20, she married Ben Wada, a television director. Wada had initially gone to school to become a painter, but this tie to her husband led to designing the stage effects and costumes for plays he was involved with. Wada has continued designing for the stage since.

She created costumes for the Akira Kurosawa film Ran, which earned her an Academy Award for costume design, the Peter Greenaway film Prospero's Books, and the Zhang Yimou films, Hero and House of Flying Daggers.  She designed costumes for operas, including the 2006 premiere performance of Tan Dun's The First Emperor and for ballets, including The Peony Pavilion by Fei Bo (National Ballet of China, 2008).

Her work for the 2015 production of The Peony Pavilion was described by The Washington Post as "some of the loveliest ballet creations in memory" with the newspaper further noting that: "Skirt hems flickered like flames as the dancers moved, and the leading ballerina’s sheer overdress floated around her like an afterglow."

Wada also designed the costumes for the 2018 Chinese adaptation of Shakespeare's King Lear.

She released multiple books of her works, including My Costumes, EMI WADA WORKS, and My Life in the Making, the latter of which was created on pieces of textiles with pictures of her work inside.

Wada died on 13 November 2021, at the age of 84.

Recent works
 Hero (2002)
 House of Flying Daggers (2005)
 Mongol (2007)
 Oh My General (2017)

Notes

External links
Emi Wada official site

1937 births
2021 deaths
Best Costume Design Academy Award winners
Japanese costume designers
People from Kyoto Prefecture
Women costume designers
Kyoto City University of Arts alumni